Pembroke Dockyard, originally called Pater Yard, is a former Royal Navy Dockyard in Pembroke Dock, Pembrokeshire, Wales.

History

It was founded in 1814, although not formally authorized until the Prince Regent signed the necessary Order in Council on 31 October 1815, and was known as Pater Yard until 1817. The Mayor of Pembroke had requested the change "in deference to the town of Pembroke some   distant".

The site selected for the dockyard was greenfield land and the closest accommodations were in Pembroke. Office space was provided by the old frigate  after she was beached. The Royal Marine garrison was housed in the hulked 74-gun ship, after she was run aground in 1832. Many of the workmen commuted by boat from nearby communities until Pembroke Dock town was built up. In 1860 the dockyard's policing was transferred to the new No. 4 Division of the Metropolitan Police, which remained in that role until the 1920s.

After the end of the First World War, the dockyard was closed by the cash-strapped Admiralty as redundant in 1926. The Royal Air Force, however, built RAF Pembroke Dock on the site during the 1930s to house its flying boats, demolishing many of the existing buildings to make room for the necessary hangars and other facilities.

Administration of the dockyard
The admiral-superintendent was the Royal Navy officer in command of a larger Naval Dockyard. Portsmouth, Devonport and Chatham all had admiral-superintendents, as did some other dockyards in the United Kingdom and abroad at certain times. The admiral-superintendent usually held the rank of rear-admiral. His deputy was the captain of the dockyard (or captain of the port from 1969).

Some smaller dockyards, such as Sheerness and Pembroke, had a captain-superintendent  instead, whose deputy was styled commander of the dockyard. The appointment of a commodore-superintendent  was also made from time to time in certain yards.

The appointment of admiral-superintendents (or their junior equivalents) dates from 1832 when the Admiralty took charge of the Royal Dockyards. Prior to this larger dockyards were overseen by a commissioner who represented the Navy Board.

Resident Commissioner of the Navy, Pater Yard (1830-1832)
Included:
 Captain Charles Bullen, July 1830 – 1832

Captain-Superintendent, Pembroke Dockyard (1857-1906)
Included:
 Captain George Ramsay: July 1857-September 1862
 Captain William Loring: September 1862-March 1866
 Captain Robert Hall: March 1866-March 1871
 Captain William Armytage: February 1871-January 1872
 Captain Richard W. Courtenay: January 1872-March 1875
 Captain Richard Vesey Hamilton: March 1875-October 1877
 Captain George H. Parkin: October 1877-October 1882
 Captain Alfred J. Chatfield: October 1882-January 1886
 Captain Edward Kelly: January 1886-June 1887
 Commodore George Digby Morant: June 1887-January 1889
 Captain Samuel Long: January 1889-August 1891
 Captain Walter Stewart: August 1891-January 1893
 Captain Charles C.Penrose Fitzgerald: January 1893-March 1895
 Captain William H. Hall: March 1895
 Captain Charles J. Balfour: March 1895-October 1896
 Captain Burges Watson: October 1896-October 1899
 Captain Charles J. Barlow: October 1899-October 1902
 Captain Gerald Walter Russell: October 1902-October 1904
 Captain John Denison: October 1904-October 1906

Rear-Admiral Superintendent, Pembroke Dockyard (1906-1915)
 Rear-Admiral Henry C. Kingsford: October 1906-December 1908
 Rear-Admiral Godfrey H.B. Mundy: December 1908-December 1911
 Rear-Admiral Alfred E.A. Grant: December 1911-September 1915

Captain-Superintendent, Pembroke Dockyard (1915-1926)
 Captain Frederick D. Gilpin Brown: September 1915-April 1918
 Captain John G. Armstrong: April 1918-February 1920
 Captain David Murray Anderson: February 1920-April 1922
 Captain the Hon. Arthur B. S. Dutton: April 1922-July 1924
 Captain Leonard A. B. Donaldson: July 1924 – 1926

Gallery of listed buildings on the site

Notes

References

 

Military installations in Wales
Pembroke Dock